Royal Prussian Jagdstaffel 81, commonly abbreviated to Jasta 81, was a "hunting group" (i.e., fighter squadron) of the Luftstreitkräfte, the air arm of the Imperial German Army during World War I. The squadron would score six or more aerial victories during July/August 1917, while serving on the Eastern Front. After switching to the Western Front, Jasta 81 would score another 35 victories from May 1918 to war's end. The unit's victories came at the expense of five killed in action, three killed in flying accidents, one injured in a flying accident, three wounded in action, and three taken prisoner of war.

History
Jasta 81 originated in Jagdflieger Ober-Ost, which was founded at Brest-Litovsk on 16 June 1917. It was intended for service on the Eastern Front. In August 1917, it was assigned to 8 Armee. In early May 1918, it was incorporated into Jagdgruppe 5. On 30 May 1918, it was revamped as Jasta 81. At this time, the squadron was posted to 7 Armee on the Western Front in France. On 27 June 1918, it was switched over to Jagdgruppe 4; in late July, it would return to JG 5. In late September 1918, the Jasta would be assigned to 3 Armee.

Commanding officers (Staffelführer)
 Josef Wulf
 Herbert Knappe: 7 April 1918 - 25 August 1918
 Fritz Höhn: c. 25 August 1918 - 9 September 1918
 Wilhelm Pritsch: 9 September 1918

Duty stations
 Kniaze: July 1917
 Mitau (present day Latvia): August 1917
 Boncourt, France
 Moislains, France
 Séranvillers, France: August 1918
 Leffincourt, France: Late September 1918
 Two successive unknown locations
 Saint-Gerard-Maison: 26 October 1918 - November 1918

Notable personnel
 Dietrich Averes
Alfons Nagler

Aircraft
In late 1917, Jasta 81 was supplied with LFG Roland D.II fighters.

References

Bibliography
 

81
Military units and formations established in 1917
1917 establishments in Germany
Military units and formations disestablished in 1918